William Taylor (31 July 1939 – 30 November 1981) was a Scottish footballer who played for junior club Bonnyrigg Rose Athletic before moving to England, where he made 122 appearances in the Football League playing for Leyton Orient, Nottingham Forest and Lincoln City. He then joined the coaching staff at Fulham. He played as a midfielder.

References

1939 births
1981 deaths
Footballers from Edinburgh
Scottish footballers
Association football midfielders
Bonnyrigg Rose Athletic F.C. players
Leyton Orient F.C. players
Nottingham Forest F.C. players
Lincoln City F.C. players
English Football League players
Fulham F.C. non-playing staff
Place of death missing